Mohamed Al-Takroni (born 5 October 1967) is a Saudi Arabian former cyclist. He competed in two events at the 1992 Summer Olympics.

References

1967 births
Living people
Saudi Arabian male cyclists
Olympic cyclists of Saudi Arabia
Cyclists at the 1992 Summer Olympics
Place of birth missing (living people)
20th-century Saudi Arabian people